The Chilean devil ray (Mobula tarapacana), also known as the box ray, greater Guinean mobula, sicklefin devil ray or the spiny mobula, is a species of ray in the family Mobulidae. It is often observed worldwide, basking just below the surface in tropical, subtropical and warm temperate oceans, mainly offshore, and occasionally appearing near the coast.

Originally believed to be surface dwellers, Mobula tarapacana have been discovered to feed at depths of up to  during deep dives; they are among the deepest-diving ocean animals. Their dives often follow a stepwise pattern, in which the ray dives deeply, then works its way back up by repeatedly "levelling up" for a bit and then moving higher.  Sonar observations suggest that rays level up where there are denser layers of prey, suggesting that this is a foraging behavior.

Rays display two distinct deep-dive patterns. The stepwise dive pattern, which is usually only performed once every 24 hours, involves diving to the maximum depth and resurfacing after 60 to 90 minutes; a second pattern, which is less frequent, involves diving up to 1,000 meters for a maximum of 11 hours. The latter pattern may be associated with traveling rather than feeding. 

The ray's behavior may be linked to an organ called the retia mirabilia, which is found in rays and in deep-diving great white sharks. A veined structure of blood vessels warms the ray's brain at colder depths. Rays stay near warmer surface water for at least an hour both before and after deep diving, suggesting that they are soaking up heat to prepare for and recover from their descent into colder water.

References

Mobula
Fish of Chile
Pantropical fish
Fish described in 1892
Taxonomy articles created by Polbot